Ooe may refer to:

 Out-of-order execution
 Ōe (surname)
 Ōeyama (大江山), a mountain range in Kyoto Prefecture, Japan, north to Kyoto.
 Ōeyama (大枝山), a mountain in Kyoto Prefecture, Japan, south to Kyoto.